Ellacombe may refer to:

 Ellacombe apparatus, a method of ringing bells
 Ellacombe, Devon
 Henry Thomas Ellacombe (1790–1885), English divine and antiquary
 Henry Nicholson Ellacombe (1822–1916), plantsman and author on botany and gardening.